John Coe may refer to:

 Jonas Coe, American-born naval commander
 John D. Coe (1755–1824), American farmer and politician from New York
 John W. Coe (1839–1890), American politician from New York